La embajada is a Spanish thriller television series created by Ramón Campos and Gema R. Neira. Starring, among others, Belén Rueda, Abel Folk, Raúl Arévalo, Úrsula Corberó, Raúl Arévalo, Chino Darín, Amaia Salamanca, Maxi Iglesias, Megan Montaner, Alicia Borrachero and Tristán Ulloa, the plot concerns a political intrigue of corruption happening in the Spanish Embassy in Thailand.

Premise 
Set in the Spanish Embassy in Bangkok, the plot tracks the events unraveling in the diplomatic mission after the arrival of the new ambassador Luis Salinas (Abel Folk) and his wife Claudia Cernuda (Belén Rueda), that would end up with the imprisonment of the former a year later on charges of money laundering, embezzlement and influence peddling, including the legal problems of the ambassador's daughter Ester (Úrsula Corberó) with drug possession, the love affair of Claudia with her daughter's boyfriend Carlos (Chino Darín), or the demand for kick-backs for the construction of a high speed train line. Claudia starts assembling the parts concerning what happened by testifying in the trial.

Cast

Production and release 
Created by Ramón Campos and Gema R. Neira, La embajada was produced by Bambú Producciones for Atresmedia. Filming started in December 2015. All filming involving actors took place in the Madrid region during Winter (including Alcobendas), featuring heavy green screen usage. The background shots were separatedly filmed in Thailand and layered with the close-up shots via chroma keying. The episodes were directed by Carlos Sedes and Eduardo Chapero-Jackson, whereas the scriptwriting team was coordinated by Carlos López. The series premiered on 25 April 2016 on Antena 3, obtaining a "promising" 22.5% audience share in the first episode. The broadcasting run of the 11-episode season ended on 11 July 2016. Pending the airing of the season finale, Atresmedia had announced that there would be no renovation for a second season.

Awards and nominations 

|-
| align = "center" | 2016 || 4th  || colspan = "2" | Best Screenplay ||  || 
|-
| align = "center" rowspan = "3" | 2017 || rowspan = "3" | 26th Actors and Actresses Union Awards || Best Television Actor in a Secondary Role || Raúl Arévalo ||  || rowspan = "3" | 
|-
| Best Television Actress in a Secondary Role || Alicia Borrachero || 
|-
| Best Television Actor in a Minor Role || Carlos Bardem || 
|}

References 

Spanish-language television shows
Television shows set in Thailand
Television shows filmed in Spain
2010s Spanish drama television series
2016 Spanish television series debuts
2016 Spanish television series endings
Political thriller television series
Spanish thriller television series
Antena 3 (Spanish TV channel) network series
Television series by Bambú Producciones